The 2007 Miami FC season was the second season of the team in the USL First Division.
This year, the team finished in ninth place for the regular season.  They did not make the playoffs.

USL First Division Regular season

Standings

First Division

References

External links

Miami FC (2006) seasons
Fort Lauderdale Strikers
Miami FC